Maxime Bally (born 22 October 1986) is a Swiss professional racing cyclist.

Career wins

2005 - Trois Jours d'Aigle (SUI)
2006 - UIV Cup Dortmund, U23 (GER)
2007 - UIV Cup Stuttgart, U23 (GER)
2007 - Soirée professionelle Genève (SUI)
2007 - Professional 6 days Zurich (SUI) 8ème
2007 - Finalist at the World Cup in Sydney

External links

1986 births
Living people
Swiss male cyclists
Swiss track cyclists
Place of birth missing (living people)
21st-century Swiss people